MV Gardyloo was a specially designed sewage dumping vessel that operated from Leith between 1978 and 1998. The ship's name is an 18th-century word derived from the French "gardez l’eau" ("mind the water"), used in Edinburgh to warn passers-by of waste about to be thrown from a window into the street below. Prior to 1978, the city of Edinburgh's waste was discharged into the Forth from a series of eight outlets along the coastline, where it often washed back up on beaches and rocks.

Construction and description
Built at a cost of £1.87 million by Ferguson Brothers (Port Glasgow) Ltd. in Port Glasgow, Gardyloo'''s task was to remove Edinburgh's sludge waste for disposal in two spots in the North Sea. The ship was launched on 4 February 1976 and was registered as a British ship with Official Number 366470 on 29 August in the same year. She was propelled by a Mirrlees Blackstone 16-cylinder diesel engine, made at Stamford, Lincolnshire, driving a single screw.

Sewage service
The ship did not go immediately into service from Leith, but was first chartered to Strathclyde Regional Council for a year from October 1976 as a replacement for their sludge vessel Shieldhall.

Beginning in 1978, Gardyloo made its sewage dumping trip up to three times a week, leaving Leith Docks at 8am to release its cargo at a spot close to the Bell Rock from May until October, and off St Abb's from October to May. It returned to Leith Docks around 6pm. In more than 2600 voyages, the MV Gardyloo dumped 8.5 million tonnes of sewage. The trip was open to the public, and during the 21 years of its operation, the MV Gardyloo carried 6000 passengers
 
This practice ceased at the end of 1998, when dumping was banned by the EU Urban Waste Water Treatment Directive, and Seafield Waste Water Treatment Works was extended to perform secondary treatment on the sewage, after which it went to a landfill site.

Tanker service
After being laid up at Hull, MV Gardyloo was sold to Unilink Group in London, then to Whittaker Tanker Co., to Delta Tank Shipping Ltd, by whom it was renamed Delta Tank. In 2004 the ship was sold to the state shipping enterprise Azerbaijan Caspian Shipping of Baku and has, since 2006, been managed by Meridian Shipping & Management LLC, Baku, as the water carrier ''Shollar.

References 

1976 ships
Ships built on the River Clyde